New York Central 3001 is a 4-8-2 "Mohawk" (Mountain)-type steam locomotive built in 1940 by the American Locomotive Company (ALCO) for the New York Central Railroad. Normally known as "Mountain" types, New York Central 4-8-2 steam locomotives were dubbed "Mohawk" types after the Mohawk River, which the New York Central followed. Built for dual service work, the 3001 was used heavily for  freight and passenger trains until being retired in 1957. The locomotive is currently on static display at the National New York Central Railroad Museum in Elkhart, Indiana. It is the largest New York Central steam locomotive still in existence and is one of two surviving New York Central Mohawks; the other, No. 2933, which was currently on display at the National Museum of Transportation in St. Louis, Missouri.

History

Background

In the late 1930s, when looking for heavier steam power to move freight and passenger trains swiftly, the New York Central looked at a dual service steam locomotive. The modern 1940 L3a from the American Locomotive Company (Alco) was able to move both heavy passenger trains and freights with relative ease. So, the NYC acquired both the L-3 and L-4 classes of Mohawks from Alco and the Lima Locomotive Works, in 1940 and 1942, respectively.

Revenue service
New York Central No. 3001 is a member of the L-3a class of locomotives. Based in Ohio after the NYC dieselized east of Cleveland between August 7 and September, 1953, the Mohawk powered many general freight and passenger trains, such as the 20th Century Limited. Until dieselization of that division in 1949, No. 3001 could often be seen hauling passenger trains on the Boston & Albany. No. 3001 was often used to haul freight trains due to many NYC Hudsons being occupied pulling passenger trains; in later years, diesel-electric locomotives hauled the passenger trains. In the final years of steam on the New York Central, the No. 3001 and other modern Mohawks were demoted to lighter trains, due to Pittsburgh and Lake Erie Railroad (NYC subsidiary) 2-8-4 "Berkshires" and NYC 4-8-4 Niagaras handling increasingly-heavier freight and passenger trains on the system. As diesels flooded the NYC, the No. 3001 and the other steam locomotives still in service saw the end coming nearer and nearer. No. 3001 was finally retired on February 14, 1957.

Preservation
The New York Central sold L-3a No. 3001 to the Texas and Pacific Railroad in March, 1957, to replace the heavily-vandalized and subsequently scrapped Texas and Pacific 2-10-4 "Texas type" No. 638, that was on display at the Texas State Fairgrounds there. The Texas and Pacific then donated No. 3001 (disguised as Texas and Pacific No. 909) to the city of Dallas, Texas. The city later donated No. 3001 (still disguised as Texas & Pacific No. 909) to the Museum of the American Railroad in Dallas. The sale to the Texas and Pacific Railroad is the sole reason why No. 3001 was not sold for scrap in 1957. In the early 1980s, after trading Pennsylvania Railroad GG-1 No. 4903 to the Museum of the American Railroad, No. 3001 made its way east to Elkhart, Indiana after being acquired by the Lakeshore Railroad Historical Foundation, but not before the locomotive was borrowed by a power plant for use as a stationary steam generator. The No. 3001 locomotive is currently still on static display in Elkhart, at the National New York Central Railroad Museum.

See also
 PRR 6755- This is the Pennsylvania Railroad's version of the Mohawk that survives at the Pennsylvania State Railroad Museum in Strasburg, PA. Just like the 3001, the 6755 was a dual-service locomotive.
 New York Central 2933
 New York Central Mohawk
 Texas and Pacific 610

References

Bibliography

New York Central Railroad locomotives
4-8-2 locomotives
ALCO locomotives
Railway locomotives introduced in 1940
Individual locomotives of the United States
Standard gauge locomotives of the United States
Preserved steam locomotives of Indiana